The 8th/7th Battalion, Royal Victoria Regiment (8/7 RVR) is an infantry battalion of the Australian Army. It is one of two battalions that make up the Royal Victoria Regiment (RVR), with its sister unit being 5th/6th Battalion, Royal Victoria Regiment. It can trace its history back to 1854 and the battalion has existed since maintaining an unbroken record of service, albeit in varying forms and under various names. The present day unit traces its lineage from a number of previous units, including 8th Battalion (City of Ballarat Regiment), 59th Battalion (The Hume Regiment), 7th Battalion (The North and West Murray Regiment), and the 38th Battalion (The Northern Victoria Regiment). Today the battalion is part of the 4th Brigade and is responsible for most of the rural areas of Victoria. The battalion has served Victorian communities  in Operation Bushfire Assist 19/20, and Operation COVID-19 Assist. The battalion maintains an affiliation with the 5th Battalion, Royal Australian Regiment, with whom many members of 8/7 RVR have undertaken periods of full-time service in recent times.

History
The Ballarat phase of the battalion's history was formed as the Ballarat Volunteer Rifle Regiment on 9 August 1858 as a result of the Crimean War, coupled with the withdrawal of the British Army in 1857.

When war broke out in 1914, the 8th Battalion was recruited from the Ballarat and Ararat areas and the 7th Battalion from the North Western and Murray areas. Both battalions became well known and respected for their actions in the Gallipoli campaign and later in France, earning numerous Campaign and Battle honours, some of which are emblazoned on the Royal Victorian Regiment's Colours, with the remainder being held in trust by the Regimental council.

After World War I, further restructuring took place in the Ballarat and North-Western Regions. At the outbreak of World War II in 1939, both the 8th and 7th Battalions were again raised, and the two battalions served alongside by side during the most significant campaigns and battles of that war.

Following World War II, the 8th and 7th Battalions were amalgamated to form the 8th/7th Battalion, the North Western Victorian Regiment. The battalion retained its name until 1960, when Pentropic Divisions were formed and the battalion became 2RVR, absorbing the 8th/7th, 38th and 59th Battalions.

On 14 November 1987, the battalion was officially retitled the 8th/7th Battalion, The Royal Victoria Regiment. It has adopted the white (8th Battalion) and brown (7th Battalion) lanyard and wears the 8th Battalion colour patch (rectangle white over red). The Battalion Flag consists of the regimental badge on a diagonally split background of brown above white.

Lineage 
In the years between its formation and the outbreak of War in 1914, the battalion went through a series of name changes as follows:
 1854 – Earliest units of the RVR formed  ( Melbourne Volunteer Rifle Regt. )
 1858 – Ballarat Volunteer Rifle Regiment (later Rangers)
 1884 – 3rd Balarat Ballarat Infantry
 1892 – 1st Battalion, 3rd Victorian Regiment
 1898 – 3rd battalion, Victoria Infantry Brigade
 1901 – 3rd Battalion Infantry Brigade
 1908 – 1st Battalion 7th Australian Infantry Regiment
 1912 – 70th Battalion (Ballarat Regiment) including Geelong
 1912 – 71st Battalion (City of Ballarat Regiment)

Further to the north the following evolution was taking place (encompassing the Bendigo/Castlemaine and Murray river areas):
 1858 – Bendigo Rifle Regiment
 1860 – Bendigo Volunteer Rifle Corps
 1870 – Castlemaine Corps of Rifles
 1872 – Mount Alexander Bn of Victorian Rifles
 1883 – 4th Battalion of Infantry
 1887 – 4th Mount Alexander battalion of Victorian Rifles
 1893 – 2nd Battalion, 3rd Victorian Regiment
 1898 – 4th Battalion, Victorian Infantry Brigade
 1903 – 8th Australian Infantry Regiment
 1908 – 1st Battalion, 8th Australian Infantry Regiment
 1912 – 66th (Mount Alexander) Infantry

Current structure

Activities and equipment
The current Commanding Officer (CO) is Lieutenant Colonel Derek Sonagen. The battalion usually parades from early February until mid December, taking part on parade nights (Tuesday 7:00 p.m. until 10:00 p.m.), with one weekend a month and a two-week continuous training exercise taking place throughout the year. There are several training periods per year, including several sub-unit (company) based exercises, normally run quarterly, and a range week, of which the battalion undertakes several days of weapon training. This complements the 4th Brigade's contribution to Exercise Hamel at the Cultana training area in South Australia in September, allowing training in combined/support arms tactics, with access to the full resources of the entire brigade.

The battalion is light infantry based, and as such uses all the weapon platforms commonly found within an Australian infantry battalion, including the standard issue EF88 Austeyr rifle (5.56 mm), F89 Minimi machine gun (5.56 mm), M72 Short Range Anti Armour Weapon (66 mm), M18A1 Claymore anti-personnel device, F1 & F3 Hand Grenades, MAG 58 machine gun (7.62 mm), 84 mm Carl Gustav rocket launcher, using the standard infantry battalion composition of four companies comprising three platoons, each containing a section of nine soldiers, with a support section held at company level.

Locations
8/7 RVR is located in the state of Victoria, with the following depots:
 Battalion Headquarters (BHQ), Ranger Barracks, Sturt Street, Ballarat
 Alpha Company Headquarters (A Coy), Newland Barracks, Myers Street, Geelong
 Bravo Company Headquarters (B Coy), Sunshine Barracks, Sunshine
 Charlie Company Headquarters (C Coy), Passchendaele Barracks, Atlas Road, Bendigo (Junortoun)

The battalion also has regional depots located at:
 Somme Barracks, Sobroan Street, Shepparton
 Bobdubi Barracks(disbanded), Ogilvie Avenue, Echuca
 RAAF Williams, Kidbrook Road, Laverton
 Kiarivu Barracks, San Mateo Avenue, Mildura
 Messine Barracks, Gray Street, Swan Hill
 Tel el Eisa Barracks, Pertobe Road, Warrnambool
 Testing & proving ground, Melbourne-Lancefield Road, Monegeetta

Battle honours
The Royal Victoria Regiment has the enviable honour of having inherited the most battle honours of any other Infantry Regiment of the Australian Defence Force. 8/7 RVR currently holds the following battle honours:

 Boer War: South Africa 1899–1902.
 World War I: Landing at Anzac Cove, Somme 1916–1918, Bullecourt, Ypres 1917, Polygon Wood, Amiens, Albert 1918, Mont St Quentin, Hindenburg Line.
 World War II: Bardia 1941, Capture of Tobruk, El Alamein, Greece 1941, South West Pacific 1942–1945, Bobdubi, Finisterres, Hari River, Borneo.

Alliances
 – The Staffordshire Regiment;
 – The Royal Regiment of Canada.

Notes

References

External links
 Official ADF website
 Image Gallery 2007
 City Grants Freedom to City
 Anniversaries of Australian Units, Ships and Corps
 Thomas Henry Scott biography
 Local Army Reserve Troops Join Puckapunyal Exercise

Royal Victoria Regiment
Military units and formations established in 1858
1858 establishments in Australia